Julio César Romero Insfrán (born 28 August 1960), nicknamed Romerito, is a Paraguayan former professional footballer who played as a midfielder, considered among the greatest players in Paraguayan football history. He is the only Paraguayan named by Pelé as one of the FIFA 100 in March 2004.

Career
Born in Luque, Paraguay, Romero started his career at local club Sportivo Luqueño in 1977, by 1979 Romero's consistent performances had earned him a place in the Paraguay national team that played in the FIFA World Youth Championship and was considered one of the best players of the tournament along with Diego Maradona. In the same year, Romero played a key role in Paraguay's win in the Copa América, scoring three goals.

In 1980, he joined now defunct New York Cosmos where he played alongside such greats as the Brazilian and German World Cup winning captains of 1970 and 1974 Carlos Alberto and Franz Beckenbauer. In the 1980 Soccer Bowl he scored the game-winning goal of a 3–0 victory over Ft. Lauderdale.

Romero moved to Brazil to play for Fluminense where he was selected as the South American Footballer of the Year in 1985. He became a fan favorite after leading the team to a Campeonato Brasileiro.

In 1986, he was a key player in helping the Paraguay national team return to the FIFA World Cup finals after a 28-year hiatus. At the finals in Mexico, he scored against Iraq and the host nation in the first round.

After a short spell with FC Barcelona in Spain and a stint in Mexico with Puebla F.C. Romero returned to South America where he played out his career with Olimpia, Club Cerro Corá and Sportivo Luqueño in Paraguay and Deportes La Serena in Chile.

During his career, he scored a little more than 400 goals.

Honours
New York Cosmos
NASL: 1980, 1982FluminenseSérie A: 1984
Campeonato Carioca: 1984, 1985BarcelonaUEFA Cup Winners' Cup: 1988–89PueblaPrimera División: 1989–90
Copa Mexico: 1989–90Olimpia AsunciónTorneo República: 1992ParaguayCopa América: 1979Individual'''
South American Footballer of the Year: 1985
Paraguayan First Division top scorer: 1990
FIFA top 125 greatest living footballers: 2004

Facts
Romero is the equal 3rd highest goalscorer in the history of the Paraguay national team with 13 goals.
Romero is a politician for the Colorado Party in his native city of Luque and works as a city counselor.
In September 2006 Romero made his debut as a rock singer in the Paraguayan music festival called "Pilsen Rock". He took the stage as a guest of the popular local band Revolber and sang the opening words of the song "Siete hermanos, 1 misil" in front of a crowd of 40,000.

References

External links
 
  
 Romero's debut as a rock singer (video)
 Midfield Dynamo's 10 Heroes of the Copa América Romero listed in the top 10
 New York Cosmos stats
 

Paraguayan footballers
Paraguayan expatriate footballers
Paraguay under-20 international footballers
Paraguay international footballers
FIFA 100
Association football midfielders
Sportivo Luqueño players
Campeonato Brasileiro Série A players
Fluminense FC players
La Liga players
FC Barcelona players
Paraguayan Primera División players
Club Olimpia footballers
Cerro Corá footballers
North American Soccer League (1968–1984) players
New York Cosmos players
Liga MX players
Club Puebla players
1986 FIFA World Cup players
Deportes La Serena footballers
Expatriate footballers in Brazil
Expatriate footballers in Chile
Expatriate footballers in Mexico
Expatriate footballers in Spain
Expatriate soccer players in the United States
Paraguayan expatriate sportspeople in Brazil
Paraguayan expatriate sportspeople in Chile
Paraguayan expatriate sportspeople in Mexico
Paraguayan expatriate sportspeople in Spain
Paraguayan expatriate sportspeople in the United States
1960 births
Living people
Sportspeople from Luque
1979 Copa América players
1987 Copa América players
South American Footballer of the Year winners
Copa América-winning players